Michael John Dunlop (born 5 November 1982) is a Scottish footballer who is currently manager at Gartcairn. Dunlop has previously played for Ayr United, Queen's Park, Dumbarton, Alloa Athletic, Brechin City, Stranraer, Albion Rovers, Stenhousemuir, Peterhead, Hurlford United and Rossvale.

Career
Dunlop, along with his younger brother Ross, signed for Scottish League Two side Stenhousemuir on 22 May 2017. The brothers had played together briefly at Queen's Park before the elder sibling moved on to Dumbarton (where he became captain after the sudden death of Gordon Lennon), then reunited for four seasons at Albion Rovers.

In January 2020, Dunlop signed for Junior side Hurlford United on loan until
the end of the season due to work commitments making it difficult to travel to his parent club Peterhead. The move was made permanent that summer, but almost no football was played in that year due to the Covid-19 pandemic in Scotland.

In May 2021, Dunlop signed for West of Scotland Football League side Rossvale as player-assistant manager.

In May 2022 Dunlop was appointed manager of Gartcairn.

He should not be confused with another player of the same name, also a defender but born in 1993, whose clubs included Forfar Athletic, Arbroath and Berwick Rangers.

Career statistics

Honours
Dumbarton
Scottish Division Three (fourth tier): 2008–09

Albion Rovers
Scottish League Two (fourth tier): 2014–15

Peterhead
Scottish League Two (fourth tier): 2018–19

References

External links
 

1982 births
Scottish footballers
Footballers from Glasgow
Living people
Association football defenders
Scottish Junior Football Association players
Scottish Professional Football League players
Scottish Football League players
Ayr United F.C. players
Queen's Park F.C. players
Dumbarton F.C. players
Alloa Athletic F.C. players
Brechin City F.C. players
Albion Rovers F.C. players
Stenhousemuir F.C. players
Stranraer F.C. players
Rossvale F.C. players
Hurlford United F.C. players
Broomhill F.C. (Scotland) players
Peterhead F.C. players
Scottish football managers